The 2019 Bethune–Cookman Wildcats football team represented Bethune–Cookman University in the 2019 NCAA Division I FCS football season. They were led by fifth-year head coach Terry Sims and played their home games at Daytona Stadium. They were a member of the Mid-Eastern Athletic Conference (MEAC). They finished the season 7–4, 5–3 in MEAC play to finish in fourth place.

Previous season

The Wildcats finished the 2018 season 7–5, 5–2 in MEAC play to finish in a tie for second place.

Preseason

MEAC poll
In the MEAC preseason poll released on July 26, 2019, the Wildcats were predicted to finish in second place.

Preseason All–MEAC teams
The Wildcats had eleven players selected to the preseason all-MEAC teams.

First Team Offense

L'Dre Barnes – C

Second Team Offense

Cedric Jackson – OL

Third Team Offense

Akevious Williams – QB

Nicholas Roos – OL

Jamal Savage – OL

First Team Defense

Marques Ford – DL

Marquis Hendrix – LB

Trevor Merritt – DB

Tydarius Peters – DB

Jimmie Robinson – RS

Third Team Defense

Gerome Howard – DL

Schedule

Game summaries

vs. Jackson State

at Miami (FL)

at Mississippi Valley State

at Howard

Morgan State

at North Carolina Central

Norfolk State

South Carolina State

at Delaware State

at North Carolina A&T

vs. Florida A&M

References

Bethune-Cookman
Bethune–Cookman Wildcats football seasons
Bethune-Cookman Football